Mortiers may refer to the following places in France:

Mortiers, Aisne, in the Aisne département 
Mortiers, Charente-Maritime, in the Charente-Maritime département